Elaszym may refer to one of two enzymes:
Pancreatic elastase
Neutrophil elastase